Iñaki Muñoz Oroz (born 2 July 1978) is a Spanish retired professional footballer who played mainly as a defensive midfielder.

He amassed La Liga totals of 150 matches and 11 goals over nine seasons, representing in the competition Osasuna and Athletic Bilbao.

Club career

Osasuna
Muñoz was born in Pamplona, Navarre. Except for a season-long loan to CD Toledo in the Segunda División B he played ten senior seasons with hometown club CA Osasuna, the first and the second teams combined. He made his La Liga debut with the former on 23 December 2001, coming on as a late substitute in a 0–1 home loss against Athletic Bilbao.

Muñoz went on to become an important first-team member, appearing in 30 games during 2005–06 as they finished fourth in the league and qualified for the UEFA Champions League while scoring five goals in as many wins, notably the winners at Deportivo de La Coruña and Atlético Madrid. In the previous campaign's Copa del Rey, he netted five times in eight matches to help Osasuna reach the final of the competition, notably once in a 3–1 quarter-final home victory over Sevilla FC (4–3 aggregate).

Athletic Bilbao
Muñoz switched west for 2007–08, moving to Basque neighbours Athletic Bilbao on a three-year contract. He appeared sparingly in his first season, and even less in the second and third – his 2009–10 output consisted of 30 minutes against Deportivo in the last matchday.

Muñoz scored his only competitive goal for the side on 31 January 2008, in a 3–3 home draw with Racing de Santander in the Spanish Cup quarter-finals.

Later years
In summer 2010, aged 32, free agent Muñoz signed with FC Cartagena of the Segunda División. He retired three years later, after lower-league spells at UD Salamanca and CD Izarra.

International career
Muñoz represented both the Basque and Navarrese autonomous teams, earning six caps in total.

References

External links

1978 births
Living people
Spanish footballers
Footballers from Pamplona
Association football midfielders
La Liga players
Segunda División players
Segunda División B players
CA Osasuna B players
CA Osasuna players
CD Toledo players
Athletic Bilbao footballers
FC Cartagena footballers
UD Salamanca players
CD Izarra footballers
Spain youth international footballers
Basque Country international footballers